Below are the squads for the Football at the 2011 Pan Arab Games, hosted by Qatar, and took place between 9 and 23 December 2011.

Group A

Bahrain
Coach:  Peter Taylor

Iraq
Coach:  Zico

Qatar

Group B

Kuwait
Coach:  Goran Tufegdžić

Oman

Saudi Arabia
Coach:  Rogério Lourenço

Group C

Jordan
Coach:  Adnan Hamad

|-----
! colspan="7" bgcolor="#B0D3FB" align="left" |
|----- bgcolor="#DFEDFD"

|-----
! colspan="7" bgcolor="#B0D3FB" align="left" |
|----- bgcolor="#DFEDFD"

|-----
! colspan="7" bgcolor="#B0D3FB" align="left" |
|----- bgcolor="#DFEDFD"

Libya

Palestine

Sudan

References 

2011